Camille Ney (1 January 1919 – 29 August 1984) was a Luxembourgian politician.

Ney was a veterinarian by profession. He was a supporter of the Christian Social People's Party, and was a member of the Chamber of Deputies from 1964 to 1979. He held government office three times: from 1971 to 1972 he was Secretary of State for Agriculture, Wine-growing and Education, from 1972 to 1974 he was Minister for Agriculture and Public Health in the second Werner-Schaus government, and from 1979 to 1982 he was Minister for Agriculture, Wine-growing, Water and Forests in the Werner-Thorn-Flesch government.

1919 births
1984 deaths
People from Redange (canton)
Luxembourgian politicians
Ministers for Agriculture of Luxembourg